Lar-e Gari is a village in Bamyan Province in central Afghanistan.

See also
Bamyan Province

References

External links 
Satellite map at Maplandia.com 

Populated places in Bamyan Province